Valentine Semibreve de Dobrowolski (1847–96) was a composer, mainly of light music of the Victorian period, including

Moonlight & Starlight, words by Frederic Weatherly
Palladino Waltz, 
Strand Waltz
Second to None polka
Waltzing words by Claxon Bellamy
The Berwick Polka 
The Shipperies. Waltz performed at the International Exhibition of Navigation, Commerce and Industry (1886).

He is buried in the St. Mary's Roman Catholic Cemetery, Kensal Green, London.

External links
Amazon

References

1847 births
1896 deaths
British composers